The Charterhouse, Coventry (also known as St. Anne's Priory, Coventry) is a grade I listed building on London Road, Coventry, in the West Midlands of England.

The current building incorporates remains from the charterhouse of St Anne, the foundation stone for which was laid in 1385 by King Richard II. It contains additions from the 15th and 16th centuries, as well as several wall paintings dating to the same era. It ceased operation as a monastery during the Dissolution of the Monasteries. Some of the original window tracery still survives.  It was used as a private home from 1848 to around 1940 when it was left as a centre for arts and culture.

The Coach House and Medieval Precinct Wall to the Charterhouse form a group of listed buildings. The Charterhouse itself is a grade I listed building, the precinct wall is grade II* listed, the coach house is grade II listed, and the whole site is a Scheduled Ancient Monument.
The site has been placed on the Heritage at Risk Register due to problems with the roof and it is now owned by the charity  Historic Coventry Trust which seeks to regenerate the site, supported by Heritage Lottery Fund grants.

The Charterhouse is on the banks of the River Sherbourne, Coventry's main river. A short distance away is the Sherbourne Viaduct, a railway bridge carrying the Coventry to Rugby railway line over the river.

See also 
Scheduled Ancient Monuments in Coventry
Grade I listed buildings in Coventry
Grade II* listed buildings in Coventry (the Precinct Wall)

References

External links

Page on the Historic Coventry website

Buildings and structures in Coventry
Carthusian monasteries in England
Monasteries dissolved under the English Reformation
Grade I listed buildings in the West Midlands (county)
Grade II* listed buildings in the West Midlands (county)
Grade I listed monasteries
Grade II* listed monasteries
Monasteries in the West Midlands (county)
Religiously motivated violence in England
Ruined abbeys and monasteries
Ruins in the West Midlands (county)
Scheduled monuments in the West Midlands (county)
1381 establishments in England
1539 disestablishments in England
14th-century church buildings in England